The Peace of Acilisene was a treaty between the Eastern Roman Empire under Theodosius I and the Sasanian Empire under Shapur III, which was resolved in 384 and again in 387.

Terms
The treaty, resolved in 384 and later in 387, divided Greater Armenia between the Eastern Roman Empire and the Sasanian Empire. The Sassanids received the larger share called Persarmenia, while the Romans retained Sophene and a smaller portion of Armenia (called Lesser Armenia). This also created a new boundary line between the two empires, running from Erzurum to Mush.

Through this treaty, the Eastern Roman Empire finally admitted the loss of the Kingdom of Iberia to the Sasanians. From this point on, Iranian influence grew once again in eastern Georgia, and Zoroastrianism spread as far as Tbilisi by the fifth century. Zoroastrianism would become like a "second established religion of Iberia".

See also
 Roman Armenia
 Persarmenia

References

Sources

4th century in Armenia
Peace treaties
4th-century treaties
Acilisene
380s
Roman–Sasanian Wars
Acilisene
380s in the Byzantine Empire
4th century in Iran
History of Georgia (country)
Theodosius I
387